Garrett Muagututia  (born February 26, 1988) is an American professional volleyball player. He played and studied for 4 years at the University of California, Los Angeles. He is a member of the US national team. Muagututia participated at the 2014 World Championship held in Poland. At the professional club level, he plays for the Indonesian team, Jakarta Bhayangkara Presisi.

His father, Faauuga Muagututia is a former United States Navy SEAL, a competitor for American Samoa at the 1994 Winter Olympics in bobsleigh.

Honours

Clubs
 National championships
 2017/2018  Portuguese Championship, with Sporting CP
 2018/2019  Greek Cup, with PAOK Thessaloniki

Individual awards
 2019: Greek Cup – Most Valuable Player

References

External links

 Player profile at TeamUSA.org
 Player profile at LegaVolley.it 
 Player profile at PlusLiga.pl 
 Player profile at Volleybox.net
 UCLA Bruins 2010 Roster – Garrett Muagututia

1988 births
Living people
Sportspeople from California
American people of Samoan descent
American men's volleyball players
Olympic volleyball players of the United States
Volleyball players at the 2020 Summer Olympics
American expatriate sportspeople in Spain
Expatriate volleyball players in Spain
American expatriate sportspeople in Finland
Expatriate volleyball players in Finland
American expatriate sportspeople in Italy
Expatriate volleyball players in Italy
American expatriate sportspeople in Turkey
Expatriate volleyball players in Turkey
American expatriate sportspeople in Poland
Expatriate volleyball players in Poland
American expatriate sportspeople in China
Expatriate volleyball players in China
American expatriate sportspeople in Portugal
American expatriate sportspeople in Greece
Expatriate volleyball players in Greece
American expatriate sportspeople in Egypt
UCLA Bruins men's volleyball players
BKS Visła Bydgoszcz players
Sporting CP volleyball players
PAOK V.C. players
Blu Volley Verona players
Warta Zawiercie players
Outside hitters